Old Downtown Harrisburg Commercial Historic District is a national historic district located at Harrisburg, Dauphin County, Pennsylvania.  The district includes 50 contributing buildings in the old central business district of Harrisburg and dating from the late-19th and early-20th centuries. Notable buildings include the Daily and Weekly Telegraph Building (1873-1874), City Bank Building (c. 1872), F.W. Woolworth (1939), Rothert's Furniture Store (1906), Bowman's Department Store (1907, 1910), Pomeroy's Department Store (c. 1890, c. 1940), and Doutrich's Clothing Store. Located in the district and listed separately are the Colonial Theatre, Keystone Building, Kunkel Building, and the William Seel Building.  The Telegraph Building was delisted after having been demolished.

It was added to the National Register of Historic Places in 1983, with a boundary increase in 1984.

References

Historic districts in Harrisburg, Pennsylvania
Greek Revival architecture in Pennsylvania
Italianate architecture in Pennsylvania
Historic districts on the National Register of Historic Places in Pennsylvania
National Register of Historic Places in Harrisburg, Pennsylvania